Eric Pulier is an American entrepreneur, author, and philanthropist based in Los Angeles, California.

Early life and education
Pulier was raised in Teaneck, New Jersey, where he attended Teaneck High School, graduating in 1984. He began programming computers in the fourth grade and started a database computer company in high school. Pulier began studying at Harvard University in 1984. He majored in English and American literature, was an editor and wrote a column for The Harvard Crimson, and took classes at neighboring school MIT. He graduated magna cum laude in 1988.

Career
Pulier moved to Los Angeles in 1991 where he founded People Doing Things (PDT), a company that addressed health care, education, and other issues through the use of technology. In 1994, he founded interactive agency Digital Evolution. The company merged with US Interactive LLC in 1998. Pulier lead the effort to build Starbright World, a private social network for chronically ill children where they can chat, blog, post content and meet others who share similar experiences.

In 1997, the Presidential Inaugural Committee selected Pulier to create and execute the Presidential Technology Exhibition in Washington D.C. called "The Bridge to the 21st Century." Following the exhibition, he participated in then-Vice President Al Gore's health care and technology forum and advised on health care and technology initiatives. Pulier is also a supporter and participant with the Clinton Global Initiative.

Pulier is the founder of numerous other ventures, including Vatom, Desktone, Media Platform, Akana and others. He also co-authored Understanding Enterprise SOA, a noted book on service-oriented architecture.

Philanthropy
Pulier is a donor to several non-profit organizations and sits on the innovation board of the X-Prize Foundation (competitions to solve humanity's greatest challenges), The Painted Turtle (camp for kids with chronic illness), and various other philanthropic organizations.

References

External links
Official site
X Prize
The Painted Turtle
Digital Evolution, LA (show reel)

American computer businesspeople
Philanthropists from New Jersey
Living people
Teaneck High School alumni
The Harvard Crimson people
Year of birth missing (living people)